The speckled tanager (Ixothraupis guttata) is a medium-sized passerine bird. It is a resident breeder in Costa Rica, Panama, Trinidad, Venezuela, Colombia, Guyana, Suriname and the extreme north of Brazil. There are also sight records from French Guiana.

It is probably a close relative of the spotted tanager (I. punctata) which replaces it to the south.

The upperparts are green with black spotting, and the face is yellow with a black line from the eye to the gape. The wings and tail are black edged with green, and the underparts are white spotted with black. The sexes are similar. The speckled tanager's flight call is a weak metallic chirping tsip.

The Trinidadian subspecies I. g. trinitatis has brighter and more extensive yellow on the head, and the black spotting is more conspicuous.

Ixothraupis guttata is more of a subtropical species than its relative and occurs in humid montane and secondary forest, with generally not very tall trees and a dense understory. Speckled tanagers are social birds which eat mainly fruit and some insects. They are often seen with bay-headed tanagers and honeycreepers.

The small cup nest is built in a tree and the normal clutch is two brown-blotched white eggs. The female incubates the eggs for 13 days to hatching, with another 15 days before the chicks fledge.

Footnotes

References
 ffrench, Richard; O'Neill, John Patton & Eckelberry, Don R. (1991): A guide to the birds of Trinidad and Tobago (2nd edition). Comstock Publishing, Ithaca, N.Y. 
 Hilty, Steven L. (2003): Birds of Venezuela. Christopher Helm, London. 
 Salaman, Paul G. W.; Stiles, F. Gary; Bohórquez, Clara Isabel; Álvarez-R., Mauricio; Umaña, Ana María; Donegan, Thomas M. & Cuervo, Andrés M. (2002): New and noteworthy bird records from the east slope of the Andes of Colombia. Caldasia 24 (1): 157–189. PDF fulltext

Further reading

speckled tanager
Birds of the Talamancan montane forests
Birds of Panama
Birds of Colombia
Birds of Venezuela
Birds of the Venezuelan Coastal Range
Birds of Trinidad and Tobago
speckled tanager
speckled tanager
Taxobox binomials not recognized by IUCN